Fidelio: Alice's Odyssey, also titled Fidelio: Alice's Journey, is a 2014 French drama film directed by Lucie Borleteau.

Cast 
 Ariane Labed as Alice 
 Melvil Poupaud as Gaël 
 Anders Danielsen Lie as Felix 
 Pascal Tagnati as Antoine 
 Jean-Louis Coulloc'h as Barbereau  
 Nathanaël Maïni as Frédéric 
 Bogdan Zamfir as Vali 
 Corneliu Dragomirescu as Constantin  
 Manuel Ramirez as Felizardo 
 Laure Calamy as Nadine Legall
 Jan Privat as Patrick Legall 
 Luc Catania as Patrick Legall (voice)

Accolades

References

External links 
 

2014 films
2014 drama films
2010s French-language films
French drama films
Seafaring films
2014 directorial debut films
2010s French films